The 2014–15 Boston University Terriers men's ice hockey team represented Boston University in the 2014–15 NCAA Division I men's ice hockey season. The team is coached by David Quinn, in his 2nd season with the Terriers. The Terriers play their home games at Agganis Arena on campus in Boston, Massachusetts, competing in Hockey East.

Personnel

Roster
As of end of season.

|}

Coaching staff

Standings

Schedule

|-
!colspan=12 style=""| Exhibition

|-
!colspan=12 style=""| Regular Season

|-
!colspan=12 style=""| Postseason

Rankings

References

Boston University Terriers men's ice hockey seasons
Boston University
Boston University
Boston University
Boston University
Boston University
Boston University
Boston University